Andreaea willii is a species of moss in the family Andreaeaceae that was described by Carl Von Müller in 1890. A. wilii was first collected during the German International Polar-Year Expedition of 1882-1883. It has been found on South Georgia.

References 

Andreaeaceae
Flora of Antarctica